The Joint Committee (German: Gemeinsamer Ausschuss) is, together with the Federal Convention, one of two non–steady constitutional bodies in the political and federal institutional system of the Federal Republic of Germany. It is designed as an emergency parliament in the case of a State of Defence. It consists of 48 members of which two thirds are members of the Bundestag and one third are members of the Bundesrat, the latter representing the governments of the states of Germany (Länder). It was established in 1968 by an amendment of the Basic Law. Ever since then, the Bundestag and the Bundesrat have elected members to serve on the committee.

Function
The constitutional role of the Joint Committee is defined in Article 53a of the Basic Law for the Federal Republic of Germany. The 32 members selected by the Bundestag are elected at the beginning of each legislative period. The sixteen state representatives are selected by their state governments whenever a new state cabinet enters office. The Joint Committee may take over certain powers of the Bundestag and the Bundesrat if a state of defence has been declared and if the Bundestag is unable to convene because of "insurmountable obstacles". The Joint Committee may take this decision itself with a two-thirds majority of members present, which has to equal a majority of all members. After that, the Joint Committee may in principle enact federal laws in place of the Bundestag and the Bundesrat. Laws enacted by the Joint Committee may however be nullified by the Bundestag with the approval of the Bundesrat at any time and expire automatically six months after the end of the State of Defence. The Joint Committee may not change the Basic Law, change the borders of the German states or transfer sovereign rights to supranational organisations. Like the Bundestag, it may vote the Chancellor out of office via a constructive vote of no confidence, but only with a two-thirds majority of its members. If a vacancy occurs, it may elect a new Chancellor upon proposal of the President of Germany and with a majority of members.

Even with the joint committee working under a state of defense, the Bundestag's other members and its committees may still meet, and members of the Federal Government can still be required to attend these meetings.

Appointment
The Bundestag appoints 32 of its members according to the size of party groups. Each of the 16 state governments appoints one member who shall also be a member of the Bundesrat and one substitute member. The President of the Bundestag is always a member, representing his or her party group, and is the chairperson of the Joint Committee. Unlike in the Bundesrat, where states may direct their delegates on how to vote, the representatives in the Joint Committee are not bound by any instructions. Deliberations of the Joint Committee are not public.

Democratic legitimacy
The provision has been criticised for being able to oust the directly elected Bundestag, in a case where the Joint Committee would vote to establish a state of defense and take power. Another concern is the combination of members of the Bundestag and Bundesrat, compromising the federal checks and balances system and the separation of powers.

However, the purpose of the Joint Committee is to ensure a democratically legitimate and functioning legislature even during a state of attack, such as a nuclear war. It is an unusual institution since in many other countries, the constitution simply designates the government (executive) to exercise legislative powers and issue urgent laws during an emergency.

The latter is also a possibility in Germany, according to article 81 of the Constitution ("legislative state of emergency", Gesetzgebungsnotstand), but such laws must also be confirmed by the Bundesrat and the President. Since the establishment of the Federal Republic of Germany, neither a State of Defense, an activation of the Joint Committee nor a legislative state of emergency has occurred.

During a 1989 exercise in the Government bunker, Gertrud Schilling, member of the Joint Committee for The Greens, said that the Joint Committee's function was severely hampered by the fact that it would be cut off from the outside world with all means of communication being controlled by the government.

Nuclear bunker
In case of war, the Joint Committee, along with other federal organs, would have been evacuated to the Government Bunker, a vast underground secret complex 25 km south of Bonn officially called the Evacuational Site of the Constitutional Bodies (Ausweichsitz der Verfassungsorgane). Large exercises were held every second year including mock meetings of the Joint Committee.

References

External links 

 

Legislative branch of the Government of Germany
National legislatures
Joint committees (legislatures)